The 2019 Phillips 66 Big 12 Conference women's basketball tournament was the postseason tournament for the Big 12 Conference held from March 8 to 11 in Oklahoma City at Chesapeake Energy Arena. Baylor won the championship game over Iowa State, 57–49. Kalani Brown was named the tournament's Most Outstanding Player.

Seeds

Schedule

Bracket
 All times are Central

All-Tournament team
Most Outstanding Player – Kalani Brown, Baylor

See also
2019 Big 12 Conference men's basketball tournament
2019 NCAA Women's Division I Basketball Tournament
2018–19 NCAA Division I women's basketball rankings

References

External links
 2019 Phillips 66 Big 12 Conference women's basketball tournament Official Website

Big 12 Conference women's basketball tournament
Tournament
Big 12 Conference women's basketball tournament
Big 12 Conference women's basketball tournament
Basketball competitions in Oklahoma City
Women's sports in Oklahoma
College sports tournaments in Oklahoma